Nathan ‍Gregor ‍Mendel (born December 2, 1968) is an American musician best known as the bass guitarist for the rock band Foo Fighters, as well as a former member of Sunny Day Real Estate. He has also worked with musical acts The Jealous Sound and The Fire Theft. He has released one solo album, If I Kill This Thing We're All Going to Eat for a Week, under the name Lieutenant. Aside from the Foo Fighters' lead vocalist and founder Dave Grohl, he is the second longest serving member of the band, and appeared on nine of the band's studio albums.

Life and career 
Mendel was born on December 2, 1968, in Richland, a mid-sized city in southeast Washington. His first instrument was the violin. At the age of 13, Mendel started to get interested in rock music and joined a band, a friend who played guitar suggested he play the bass. Mendel stated that "as I picked up that bass I went on a 20-year detour into punk", helped by his town usually having concerts of DIY punk bands such as Scream. This led to a "pretty limited musical education", as despite taking some lessons with a bassist from a local band, Mendel mostly taught himself to play, and "it was all hardcore punk rock, like Minor Threat, Black Flag and Bad Brains. Instead of studying the bass playing of someone like John Entwistle, which would have given me a foundation of how to play. I just wanted to play a lot of notes fast."

Mendel began his musical career in the hardcore band Diddly Squat, which only recorded a 7" single but did a national tour during the 1988 summer vacation. After Diddly Squat ended, Mendel moved to Seattle, where he spent four months on the straight edge band Brotherhood. Afterward, he joined the band Christ on a Crutch, which included bandmate Glen Essary and lasted until 1993. In 1992, Mendel and his University of Washington housemate Dan Hoerner decided to form a band, and invited drummer William Goldsmith to form the group that would end up being named Sunny Day Real Estate (SDRE). Mendel added that SDRE was an attempt to "play more intricate, interesting music". While Mendel toured Europe with Christ on a Crutch, Jeremy Enigk jammed with the remaining members and eventually became a full-time member of SDRE.

Just before Sunny Day Real Estate disbanded in 1995, Mendel and Goldsmith were invited by Dave Grohl to join his band, the Foo Fighters, during the week of Halloween in late October 1994. He has remained a bandmember ever since, being one of the only original members in the Foo Fighters' current lineup along with Grohl and former Nirvana live guitarist Pat Smear. Although Sunny Day Real Estate reunited for two more albums (How It Feels to Be Something On and The Rising Tide), he stayed with the Foo Fighters, in Sunny Day Real Estate, he was replaced by Jeff Palmer, and Palmer was replaced by Joey Skyward, when Skyward left the band, Jeremy Enigk (lead vocalist, rhythm guitarist, and keyboardist) moved to the bass. After Sunny Day Real Estate disbanded once more, he joined with other Sunny Day Real Estate members Jeremy Enigk and William Goldsmith to form The Fire Theft, who released a self-titled album in 2003. In 2001, he played with Juno.

He scored a role in the indie movie Our Burden Is Light, in which he also played a minor role as the main female character's best friend's boyfriend and bassist. In the movie, Mendel plays in a band named Bleeder, consisting of himself, Jessica Ballard, and Taylor Hawkins.

In June 2009, it was confirmed that Sunny Day Real Estate plans to reunite again, with Mendel back in the fold. The band toured in 2009, confirming a new album in the works. However, recording sessions proved to be unproductive and by 2013, the group had broken up once again.

Technique 

Mendel at first considered the bass a melodic instrument, and thus liked to input more personality in his bass parts. Bass Player described Mendel's style in Sunny Day Real Estate as "heavy-handed and fleet-footed, rooted in punk rock but prone to melodic flights that encircled the band's airy arrangements", and Mendel added that in his first years of the Foo Fighters he tried "to make these songs as complicated as I could and put as much bass on there as possible". He eventually changed his priorities to the more traditional bass style where the instrument acts as "the bridge between the melodic element and the percussion", saying that he "alter[ed] the way I play bass so it works in this band, so I can support Dave's songs as best as possible." The priorities he learned to take with his playing was to "play tight and lock better with the drums" adding that when Grohl and drummer Taylor Hawkins decide to redo the drum tracks, at times Mendel would have to remake his whole basslines.

Mendel is known to use a pick almost exclusively. His preferred style was alternate picking, but on the fifth Foo Fighters album, In Your Honor, he started to employ downpicking because "with this kind of music, you need the consistency and percussive sound you get from playing with downstrokes." For the acoustic shows, Mendel played fingerstyle.

Nate is rarely seen singing. However he sang backup with Chris Shiflett on Monkey Wrench at the Tabernacle in Atlanta in 2000 while supporting There Is Nothing Left to Lose. He and Shiflett sang the outro backing vocals ("fall in, fall out"). He is also seen doing backing vocals on "I'll Stick Around" at Bizarre Festival in 2000. Also, he sang backing vocals at Bucknell University in 2000 on "Monkey Wrench".

Equipment 
Mendel's main set-up consists of Fender Precision Basses with GHS strings, played through Ashdown amplifiers. Mendel described the Precision as "iconic" in both its looks and its sound. The bassist's preferred P-Bass is his first, a 1971 model sold to him by the lead singer of Christ on a Crutch which Mendel adapted to be easier to play. Mendel also plays Lakland basses, particularly the Bob Glaub Signature, one of which was employed on the Foo Fighters' seventh album, Wasting Light. He uses a Fulltone Bassdrive pedal, though Mendel downsized the usage of effects pedals as the Foo Fighters rose its number of musicians – "Now that we have three guitar players, there's a lot of distortion going on, so I try to keep it clean and stay in line with the kick drum. That way, I know that even if we're playing a big echoey venue, at least the bass will come across with some bite and precision."

Personal life

Family 
Mendel met Kate Jackson, co-founder of independent public relations firm Grandstand Media, in 2009 while she was director of marketing and publicity at Sub Pop Records and Mendel was touring as part of a reunion of the original lineup of Sub Pop recording artists Sunny Day Real Estate. They were married on October 11, 2014, accompanied by close friends and family including Mendel's Foo Fighters bandmates. On July 19, 2018, Mendel took a one-show leave of absence from the Foo Fighters' Concrete & Gold tour, with Jane's Addiction bassist Chris Chaney filling in for him for one night at the PPG Paints Arena in Pittsburgh, as he chose to be with Jackson as she gave birth to the couple's twin girls.

HIV/AIDS denial 
Mendel has expressed fringe views on HIV & AIDS. In January 2000, he organized a sold-out concert in Los Angeles to benefit Alive & Well AIDS Alternatives, an HIV/AIDS denialism group. In April 2000, MTV News reported that "The Foo Fighters have gone on record advocating Alive & Well, an alternative AIDS information group that questions the link between HIV and AIDS." The Centers for Disease Control describe AIDS as the "most severe stage of HIV." Sandra Thurman, then director of the Office of National AIDS Policy commented:For the Foo Fighters to be promoting this is extraordinarily irresponsible behavior. There is no doubt about the link between HIV and AIDS in the respected scientific community and it's quite unfortunate that a band reads one book and then adopts this theory. To say [that HIV does not cause AIDS] is akin to saying the world is flat. Responding to coverage of the Alive & Well benefit in Mother Jones magazine, Mendel wrote, "I am not a medical professional, and I am relatively new to these questions, but I am convinced that those who have tested HIV positive and those sick with AIDS are being done a disservice by not having all the information available to them." Links and references to Alive & Well were removed from the band's website by March 2003.

Discography

Sunny Day Real Estate 

 Diary (1994)
 Sunny Day Real Estate (1995)

Foo Fighters 

 The Colour and the Shape (1997)
 There is Nothing Left to Lose (1999)
 One by One (2002)
 In Your Honor (2005)
 Echoes, Silence, Patience & Grace (2007)
 Wasting Light (2011)
 Sonic Highways (2014)
 Concrete and Gold (2017)
 Medicine at Midnight (2021)

Juno 
 A Future Lived in Past Tense (2001)

The Fire Theft 
 The Fire Theft (2003)

Lieutenant 
 If I Kill This Thing We're All Going to Eat for a Week (2015)

References

External links

1968 births
Living people
American rock bass guitarists
American male bass guitarists
Foo Fighters members
HIV/AIDS denialists
People from Richland, Washington
Grammy Award winners
Guitarists from Washington (state)
20th-century American guitarists
Sunny Day Real Estate members
The Fire Theft members